The nature of religion in the pre-colonial Philippines is often unclear. Religions present include animism, indigenous religious beliefs and mythologies such as Anito and influences from Hinduism and Buddhism. The earliest pieces of evidence that exist are archaeological finds including Hindu–Buddhist gold statues. The earliest written evidence comes from the Laguna Copperplate Inscription, dated to around 900 CE, which uses the Buddhist–Hindu lunar calendar. With the arrival of Islam in the 14th century, the older religions gradually disappeared, and after the arrival of Ferdinand Magellan in 1521 Christianity, specifically Roman Catholicism, became the dominant religion. However, some of the indigenous peoples of the Philippines continue to practice animism today, and many of the traditions in Anito have survived in the form of Folk Catholicism.

Animism 

Animism was widely practiced in the pre-colonial Philippines. Today, only a handful of the indigenous tribes continue to practice the old traditions. The term animism encompasses a collection of beliefs and cultural mores anchored more or less in the idea that the world is inhabited by spirits and supernatural entities, both good and bad, and that respect must be accorded to them through worship. These nature spirits later became known as "diwatas", despite keeping most of their native meanings and symbols, due to the influence of Hinduism in the region.

Some worship specific deities, such as the Tagalog supreme deity, Bathala, and his children Adlaw, Mayari, and Tala, or the Visayan deity Kan-Laon. These practices coincided with ancestor worship. Tagalogs for example venerated animals like the crocodile (buaya) and often called them "nonong" (from cognate 'nuno' ie 'ancestor' or 'elder'). A common ancient curse among the Tagalogs is "makain ka ng buwaya" "may the crocodile eat you!" Animistic practices vary between different ethnic groups. Magic, chants and prayers are often key features. Its practitioners were highly respected (and sometimes feared) in the community, as they were healers (Mananambal), midwives (hilot), shamans, witches and warlocks (mangkukulam), tribal historians and wizened elders that provided the spiritual and traditional life of the community.

In the Visayan regions, shamanistic and animistic beliefs in witchcraft and mythical creatures like aswang (vampires), duwende (dwarves), and bakonawa (a gigantic sea serpent) Similarly to Naga, may exist in some indigenous peoples alongside more mainstream Christian and Islamic faiths.

Anito
Anito is a collective name for the pre-Hispanic belief system in the Philippines.  It is also used to refer to spirits, including the household deities, deceased ancestors, nature-spirits, nymphs and diwatas (minor gods and demi-gods). Ancient Filipinos kept statues to represent these spirits, ask guidance and protection. Elders, ancestors and the environment were all highly respected. Although Anito survives to the present day, it has for the most part been Christianized and incorporated into Folk Catholicism.

Folk healers
During the pre-Hispanic period, babaylan were shamans and spiritual leaders and mananambal were medicine men.  At the onset of the colonial era, the suppression of the babaylans and the native Filipino religion gave rise to the albularyo. By exchanging the native prayers and spells with Catholic oraciones and Christian prayers, the albularyo was able to syncretize the ancient mode of healing with the new religion.

Revitalization attempts
In search of a national culture and identity, away from those imposed by Spain during the colonial age, Filipino revolutionaries during the Philippine Revolution proposed to revive the indigenous Philippine folk religions and make them the national religion of the entire country. However, due to the war against the Spanish and, later, American colonizers, focus on the revival of the indigenous religions were sidelined to make way for war preparations against occupiers.

Buddhism

Although no written record exists about early Buddhism in the Philippines, recent archaeological discoveries and a few scant references in the other nations' historical records can testify that Buddhism was present from the 9th century. These records mention the independent states that comprised the Philippine archipelago, rather one united country as the Philippines are organized today.

Early Philippine states became tributary states of the powerful Buddhist Srivijaya empire that controlled trade in Maritime Southeast Asia from the 6th to the 13th centuries. The states' trade contacts with the empire either before or during the 9th century served as a conduit to introduce Vajrayana Buddhism to the Philippines.

In 1225, China's Zhao Rugua, a superintendent of maritime trade in Fukien province wrote the book entitled Zhu Fan Zhi in which he described trade with a country called Ma-i on the island of Mindoro in Luzon. In it he said:

In the 12th century, Malay immigrants arrived in Palawan, where most settlements came to be ruled by Malay chieftains. They were followed by the Indonesians of the Majapahit Empire in the 13th century, and they brought with them Buddhism.

Surviving Buddhist images and sculptures are primarily found in and at Tabon Cave.
Recent research conducted by Philip Maise has included the discovery of giant sculptures, has also discovered what he believes to be cave paintings within the burial chambers in the caves depicting the Journey to the West.

The Chinese annal Song Shih recorded the first appearance of a tributary mission from Butuan (Li Yui-han 李竾罕 and Jiaminan) at the Chinese Imperial Court on March 17, 1001 AD. It described Butuan as a small maritime Hindu country with a Buddhist monarchy that had regular contact with Champa and intermittent contact with China under the Rajah named Kiling.

The Ancient Batangueños were influenced by India as shown in the origin of most languages from Sanskrit and certain ancient potteries. A Buddhist image was reproduced in mould on a clay medallion in bas-relief from the municipality of Calatagan. According to experts, the image in the pot strongly resembles the iconographic portrayal of Buddha in Siam, India, and Nepal. The pot shows Buddha Amithaba in the tribhanga pose inside an oval nimbus. Scholars also noted that there is a strong Mahayanic orientation in the image, since the Boddhisattva Avalokitesvara was also depicted.

Lunar observations

 Subang – new moon
 Gimat/ungut – full crescent
 Hitaas na an subang – high new moon (3rd day)
 Balining – the 4th or 5th night
 Odto na anbalan – quarter moon
 Dayaw/paghipono/takdul/ugsan – full moon
 Madulumdulum – waning moon
 Banolor – night or 2 later of waning, set on western horizon just before dawn
 Parik – 5th or 6th night of waning
 Katin – 3rd quarter so it crossed the 2nd barrier by the 24th or 25th night
 Malasumbang – 29th night; getting ready for the new moon

Hinduism

The archipelagoes of Southeast Asia were under the influence of Hindu Tamil, Gujarati and Indonesian traders through the ports of Malay-Indonesian islands. Indian religions, possibly an syncretic version of Hindu-Buddhism, arrived in the Philippine archipelago in the 1st millennium AD, through the Indonesian kingdom of Srivijaya followed by Majapahit. Archeological evidence suggesting exchange of ancient spiritual ideas from India to the Philippines includes the 1.79 kilogram, 21 carat golden image of Agusan (sometimes referred to as Golden Tara), found in Mindanao in 1917 after a storm and flood exposed its location. The statue now sits in the Field Museum of Natural History in Chicago, and is dated from the period 13th to early 14th centuries.

Juan Francisco suggests that the golden Agusan statue may be a representation of goddess Sakti of the Siva-Buddha (Bhairava) tradition found in Java, in which the religious aspect of Shiva is integrated with those found in Buddhism of Java and Sumatra.

Folklore, arts and literature
Most fables and stories in Philippine culture are linked to Indian arts, such as the story of monkey and the turtle, the race between the deer and the snail (similar to the Western story of The Tortoise and the Hare), and the hawk and the hen. Similarly, the major epics and folk literature of the Philippines show common themes, plots, climax and ideas expressed in the Mahabharata and the Ramayana.

According to Indologists Juan R. Francisco and Josephine Acosta Pasricha, Hindu influences and folklore was firmly established in Philippines when the surviving inscriptions of about 9th to 10th century AD were discovered. The Maranao version is the Maharadia Lawana (King Rāvaṇa of Hindu Epic Ramayana). Lam-Ang is the Ilocano version and Sarimanok (akin to the Indian Garuda) is the legendary bird of the Maranao people. In addition, many verses from the Hud-Hud of the Ifugao are derived from the Indian Hindu epics Ramayana and the Mahabharata.

Buddhist-Hindu influences in culture

The Darangen or Singkil epic of the Maranao people hearten back to this era as the most compete local version of the Ramayana. Maguindanao at this time was also strongly Hindu, evidenced by the Ladya Lawana (Rajah Ravana) epic saga that survives to the modern day, as albeit highly Islamized from the 17th century onwards,

Tigmamanukan 

The Tigmamanukan was a blue and black bird (believed to be the Philippine Fairy Bluebird) which served as a messenger of Bathalang Maykapal, in which it was also an omen. If one encountered a Tigmamanukan while traveling, they should take note of the direction of its flight. If the bird flew to the right, the traveler would not encounter any danger during their journey. If it flew to the left, the traveler would never find their way and would be lost forever.

Tikbalang

It traces the image of the Tikbalang back 4000 years, finding its roots in Hinduism and explains how that influence evolved into the mysterious half horse creature we know today.

Natives of the ancient concept of monotheism to reduce the uncertainty of the future. This ancient belief is considered animism. They had knowledge and they thought that the world has its own consciousness. They believed that stones, trees, mountains, water, animals, sun, moon and has a hidden power quickened the spirit or 'idol'. Could be good or harm the spirit, but it is believed to control some aspects of life. 
in 1589, when the earliest days of the Spanish occupation, documented by Father Juan de Plasencia with long-term tikbalang awareness of indigenous peoples .

Hinduism began in 3000 BC in India and spread to Southeast Asia in 200 CE. Had developed several routes of trade and cultural influence spread throughout the region. Soon, there was some kind of Buddhism in Asia but remained Hindu influences. This happened before Islam and Christianity in the region, this might have to do with Tikbalang Hayagriva was the avatar of the Hindu god Vishnu. The worship of Hayagriva was recorded in 2000 BCE.

The images for giant flying birds, the Tikbalang, and Sirena are straight out of Hindu imagery. Influence on religion was also prevalent with the concept of a multi-layered world – Heaven and Hell.  According to the Hindu Puranas, there are fourteen worlds in the universe – the seven upper and the seven lower. The seven upper worlds are Bhuh, Bhavah, Swah, Mahah, Janah. Tapah, and Satyam; and the seven nether worlds are Atala, Vitala, Sutala, Rasatala, Talatala, Mahatala, and Patala. The region known as Bhuh is the earth where we dwell.

Began its association with Tikbalang 1860 discovery of a statue to Cambodia since the 10th century. It described the demons that Vadavamuka, the more radical version of the avatar of Vishnu. Eventually, Buddhism changed the image of Hayagriva a small horse's head floated to crown fire. In China, provided the old image of Hayagriva face with horses – one of the demons keeper into the inferno. Probably has the same happened in Tikbalang adapt it to the Filipinos in their beliefs after exacting culture through trade. Nine hundred years before the Spaniards arrived, went to the Chinese merchants in the Philippines and while there they use horses. But there's just started the evolution of Tikbalang.

Islam
 

The Muslim Bruneian Empire, under the rule of Sultan Bolkiah (who is an ancestor of the current Sultan of Brunei, Hassanal Bolkiah), subjugated the Kingdom of Tondo in 1500. Afterwards, an alliance was formed between the newly established Kingdom of Maynila (Selurong) and the Sultanate of Brunei and the Muslim Rajah Sulaiman was installed in power. Furthermore, Sultan Bolkiah's victory over Sulu and Seludong (modern day Manila), as well as his marriages to Laila Mecanai, the daughter of Sulu Sultan Amir Ul-Ombra (an uncle of Sharifa Mahandun married to Nakhoda Angging or Maharaja Anddin of Sulu), and to the daughter of Datu Kemin, widened Brunei's influence in the Philippines.

Rajah Suleyman and Rajah Matanda in the south (now the Intramuros district) were installed as Muslim kings and the Buddhist-Hindu settlement was under Raja Lakandula in northern Tundun (now Tondo.) Islamization of Luzon began in the sixteenth century when traders from Brunei settled in the Manila area and married locals while maintaining kinship and trade links with Brunei and thus other Muslim centres in Southeast Asia. There is no evidence that Islam had become a major political or religious force in the region, with Father Diego de Herrera recording that inhabitants in some villages were Muslim in name only.

Historiographic sources

Early foreign written records
Most records concerning pre-colonial Philippine religion can be traced back through various written accounts from Chinese, Indian and Spanish sources. 
 The Laguna Copperplate Inscription (LCI)
 Zhu Fan Zhi
 Boxer Codex- Spanish written accounts

LCI

The Laguna Copperplate Inscription (LCI) is the most significant archaeological discovery in the Philippines because it serves as the first written record of the Philippine nation. The LCI mentions a debt pardon for a person, Namwaran, and his descendants by the Rajah of Tundun (now Tondo, Manila) on the fourth day after Vaisakha, in the Saka year 822, which has been estimated to correspond to April 21, 900 CE.  The LCI uses the old Buddhist-Hindu lunar calendar.

Antoon Postma, an anthropologist and an expert in ancient Javanese literature, has deciphered the LCI and he says it records a combination of old Kavi, Old Tagalog, and Sanskrit.

Ancient artifacts

The Philippines's archaeological finds include many ancient gold artifacts. Most of them have been dated to belong to the 9th century.

The artifacts reflect the iconography of the Vajrayana Buddhism and its influences on the Philippines's early states.

Some of the iconography and artifacts are exampled

 Lingling-o The artifacts' distinct features point to their production in the islands. It is probable that they were made locally because archaeologist Peter Bellwood discovered the existence of an ancient goldsmith's shop that made the 20-centuries-old lingling-o, or omega-shaped gold ornaments in Batanes.
 Copper Buddhas of Ma-i (metal relics) – "The gentleness of Tagalog customs that the first Spaniards found, very different from those of other provinces of the same race and in Luzon itself, can very well be the effect of Buddhism. "There are copper Buddha's" images. the people in Ma-i sound like newcomers [to this port] since they don't know where those metal statues in the jungle come from."
 Bronze Lokesvara – This is bronze statue of Lokesvara was found in Isla Puting Bato in Tondo, Manila.
 Buddha Amithaba bass relief The Ancient Batangueños were influenced by India as shown in the origin of most languages from Sanskrit and certain ancient potteries. A Buddhist image was reproduced in mould on a clay medallion in bas-relief from the municipality of Calatagan. According to experts, the image in the pot strongly resembles the iconographic portrayal of Buddha in Siam, India, and Nepal. The pot shows Buddha Amithaba in the tribhanga pose inside an oval nimbus. Scholars also noted that there is a strong Mahayanic orientation in the image, since the Boddhisattva Avalokitesvara was also depicted.
 Golden Garuda of Palawan- The other finds are the garuda, the mythical bird that is common to Buddhism and Hinduism, Another gold artifact, from the Tabon Caves in the island of Palawan, is an image of Garuda, the bird who is the mount of Vishnu. The discovery of sophisticated Hindu imagery and gold artifacts in Tabon Caves has been linked to those found from Oc Eo, in the Mekong Delta in Southern Vietnam.
 Bronze Ganesha statues – A crude bronze statue of a Hindu Deity Ganesha has been found by Beyer in 1921 in an ancient site in Puerto Princesa, Palawan and in Mactan. Cebu the crude bronze statue indicates of its local reproduction.
 Mactan Alokitesvara – Excavated in 1921 in Mactan, Cebu by Beyer, the bronze statue may be a siva-buddhist blending rather than "pure Buddhist".
 The Golden Tara was discovered in 1918 in Esperanza, Agusan by Bilay Campos a Manobo tribeswoman. The Golden Tara was eventually brought to the Field Museum of Natural History in Chicago, Illinois in 1922.  Beyer and other experts have agreed on its identity and have dated it to belong within 900–950 CE.  They cannot place, however, its provenance because it has distinct features.
 Golden Kinnari- The golden-vessel kinnari was found in 1981 in Surigao. The kinnari exists in both Buddhist and Hindu mythology. In Buddhism, the kinnari, a half-human and half-bird creature, represents enlightened action.  The Buddhist Lotus Sutra mentions the kinnari as the celestial musician in the Himavanta realm. The kinnari takes the form of a centaur, however, in India's epic poem, the Mahabharata, and in the Veda's Purana part.
 Padmapani and Nandi images – Padmapani is also known as Avalokitesvara, the wisdom being or Bodhisattva of Compassion. Golden jewelry found so far include rings, some surmounted by images of Nandi – the sacred bull, linked chains, inscribed gold sheets, gold plaques decorated with repoussé images of Hindu deities.
 
Laguna Copperplate Inscription In 1989, a laborer working in a sand mine at the mouth of Lumbang River near Laguna de Bay found a copper plate in Barangay Wawa, Lumban. This discovery, is now known as the Laguna Copperplate Inscription by scholars. It is the earliest known written document found in the Philippines, dated to be from the 9th century AD, and was deciphered in 1992 by Dutch anthropologist Antoon Postma. The copperplate inscription suggests economic and cultural links between the Tagalog people of Philippines with the Javanese Medang Kingdom, the Srivijaya empire, and the Hindu-Buddhist kingdoms of India. This is an active area of research as little is known about the scale and depth of Philippine history from the 1st millennium and before.

See also

Ancient barangay
Buddhism in the Philippines
Deities of Philippine mythology
Diwata
Gabâ
Hinduism in the Philippines
History of the Philippines
Kulam

References

Sources

External links
Paul Morrow's THE LAGUNA COPPERPLATE INSCRIPTION

Hinduism in the Philippines
Religion in the Philippines
History of the Philippines (900–1565)